Edward Hall (8 February 1876 – 30 December 1903) was an Australian rules footballer who played for St Kilda in the Victorian Football League (VFL).

Hall holds the league record for having the worst winning percentage of all VFL/AFL footballers to have played at least 50 games. He experienced victory just once in his league career, when St Kilda defeated Carlton at Junction Oval during the 1901 VFL season. Before that, Hall had appeared in 62 successive losses from his debut in 1897.

A centreman, he briefly became a field umpire in 1900 but after officiating in a round two game ended up finishing the season and his career back at St Kilda.

Footnotes

References
Holmesby, Russell and Main, Jim (2007). The Encyclopedia of AFL Footballers. 7th ed. Melbourne: Bas Publishing.

External links

1876 births
1903 deaths
St Kilda Football Club players
Australian Football League umpires
Australian rules footballers from Ballarat